Llandaf railway station is in Llandaff North, Cardiff, Wales. It serves the areas of Llandaff North and Whitchurch.

History
The Taff Vale Railway opened the station in 1840, only ten years after the first stations for locomotive-drawn trains had been opened on the Liverpool and Manchester Railway. Originally named Llandaff, the station had been renamed Llandaff for Whitchurch by 1910, and on 12 May 1980 it was again renamed Llandaf.

In 2015 work started on replacing the old footbridge with one that offers step-free access to all platforms. This was funded by Network Rail and the Department of Transport Access for all Scheme. A new ticket office opened in November 2017 to replace the old station building (on platform 2) which is open six days a week.

Further improvements planned in connection with the proposed South Wales Metro network included new waiting shelters, improved bike storage, refurbishment of the existing car park, extra lighting and CCTV.

Services
The station has a frequent Monday to Saturday service, and a more limited Sunday service, throughout the year. Under the timetable reforms of Arriva Trains Wales in 2006, the station benefited from the introduction of a Monday to Saturday service with six trains per hour in each direction.

The station is popular with commuters between Llandaf and Cathays, Cardiff Queen Street and Cardiff Central. Trains are often especially crowded in rush hours.

See also
List of railway stations in Cardiff
Rail transport in Cardiff

References

External links

Railway stations in Cardiff
DfT Category E stations
Former Taff Vale Railway stations
Railway stations in Great Britain opened in 1840
Railway stations served by Transport for Wales Rail
Llandaff